Sister Death is an upcoming supernatural horror film directed by Paco Plaza and written by Jorge Guerricaechevarría. It is a prequel to the 2017 film Verónica.

Plot 
Set in Spain in the aftermath of the Civil War, the story follows Narcisa, a novice nun with supernatural gifts who joins a school to teach young girls.

Cast

Production 

The screenplay was penned by Jorge Guerricaechevarría. Produced by El Estudio, filming began in the Valencia region in March 2022. The Monastery of Sant Jeroni de Cotalba was chosen as shooting location to portray the school and former convent where the fiction takes place. Enrique López Lavigne, Pablo Cruz and Diego Suarez Chialvo took over production duties, whereas Daniel F. Abelló did so with cinematography, Laia Ateca with art direction and Alberto Álvarez with production supervision.

Release 
The film will be distributed by Netflix, with a release expected for 2023.

See also 
 List of Spanish films of 2023

References 

Upcoming Netflix original films
Films shot in the province of Valencia
Films set in Spain
Films set in the 20th century
Spanish supernatural horror films
Films about Catholic nuns
Films set in schools
Upcoming films
Films directed by Paco Plaza
2023 horror films
2023 films
Upcoming Spanish-language films